Youngstown is an unincorporated community in San Joaquin County, in the U.S. state of California.

References

Unincorporated communities in California
Unincorporated communities in San Joaquin County, California